Larry Wilcox  is a former American football coach. He served as the head football coach at Benedictine College in Atchison, Kansas from 1979 to 2020, compiling a record of 305–153.  Before the beginning of the 2011 season, he was the coach with the third most victories in the National Association of Intercollegiate Athletics. On October 18, 2014, Wilcox became the fourth NAIA football coach to reach 250 career victories in the Ravens' 49–6 win over Peru State.

Head coaching record

See also
 List of college football coaches with 200 wins
 Larry Wilcox Stadium

References

Year of birth missing (living people)
Living people
Benedictine Ravens football coaches
Benedictine Ravens football players